Woodbank is a historical villa and park located in Stockport, Greater Manchester, England. The surrounding park is known as Woodbank Memorial Park, located to the east of Vernon Park. The villa was built in 1812–14 by Thomas Harrison in the Greek Revival style for Peter Marsland, a prominent industrialist in the Stockport area. Woodbank was known to have been used for the purpose of a museum and art gallery at one time but no longer. It is recorded in the National Heritage List for England as a Grade II* listed building, having been designated on 10 March 1975.

See also

Grade II* listed buildings in Greater Manchester
Listed buildings in Stockport
List of works by Thomas Harrison

References

Country houses in Greater Manchester
Buildings and structures in Stockport
Country parks in Greater Manchester
Parks and commons in the Metropolitan Borough of Stockport
Grade II* listed buildings in Greater Manchester
Greek Revival houses in the United Kingdom
Houses completed in 1814